Eilema birketsmithi is a moth of the subfamily Arctiinae first described by Hervé de Toulgoët in 1977. It is found in Ethiopia.

References

birketsmithi
Moths described in 1977